Luke Hayes-Alexander (born 1990) is a Canadian chef. He was the executive chef of Luke's Gastronomy in Kingston, Ontario, and held this position from 2006 until 2012 when the family sold the restaurant. 

Hayes lived in Australia for a year before moving to Toronto and founding an underground supper club in 2013, based in Kensington Market.

He is noted for his skill as a charcutier and for his historically informed command of the techniques of molecular gastronomy. His restaurant served wine from its own vineyard.

In November 2010, he addressed the first TEDxQueensU Conference at Queen's University.

References

External links

The Future of Food
Luke Hayes-Alexander on Canada AM

1990 births
Canadian male chefs
Molecular gastronomy
Living people
Canadian restaurateurs